The KAI KT-1 Woongbi (Hangul: KT-1 웅비) is a South Korean  single-engined turboprop, basic training aircraft. It was jointly developed by Korea Aerospace Industries (KAI) and the Agency for Defence Development (ADD).

Development

Origins
The origins of the KT-1 can be found within the KTX programme, which had been launched during 1988 on behalf of the Republic of Korea Air Force (RKAF). The programme, which sought to develop an indigenously designed trainer aircraft, was a joint effort between aircraft manufacturer Korea Aerospace Industries (KAI) and government body Agency for Defence Development (ADD); the latter was responsible for overseeing the project, while the former performed the detailed design work as well as the majority of manufacturing activity. CATIA computer aided design (CAD) software was used to produce the design.

A series of nine prototypes were constructed, the first being complete during June 1991. During November 1991, the maiden flight of the KT-1 took place, after which the flight testing programme formally commenced. During 1995, the aircraft was officially named 'Woongbi'. In 1998, it was announced that the final test flight had been performed. During the following year, an initial production contract was signed for eighty-five aircraft, with provisions for an additional twenty, between manufacturer Korea Aerospace Industries (KAI) and the RKAF.

Further development
During 2002, KAI revealed that they were working on the production of an upgraded and armed version of the KT-1 basic trainer. This variant, designated KO-1, was intended to be used in the forward air control and counter-insurgency (COIN) roles. Development was conducted in cooperation with the Agency for Defence Development (ADD) and had been undertaken in response to an existing RKAF requirement for 20-40 aircraft. According to a KAI representative, the KO-1 is ideally suited for drug interdiction operations and that the company was pitching the variant towards countries in Latin America.

On 8 March 2006, a KAI spokesperson announced that the company intended to export more than 150 improved versions of the KT-1 to various countries across both Central America and Southeast Asia. Furthermore, an improved export version of the KT-1, which was called KT-1C, was also to be launched to support these ambitions. During 2005, KAI had begun marketing the KT-1 as one element of an integrated training package, having paired it with their newer jet-powered KAI T-50 Golden Eagle trainer. The company also stated that it believes a partnership with American aerospace company Lockheed Martin shall encourage confidence in its training platforms.

Design

The KT-1 can be equipped with either an analog or 'glass' cockpit configuration. Some variants feature additional avionics and systems, such as a night vision goggles (NVG)-compatible cockpit, head-up display (HUD), multi-function displays (MFD), GPS/inertial navigation system, mission computer, onboard oxygen generation system, a vapour-cycle environmental control system and hands-on-throttle-and-stick (HOTAS)-compatible controls. Avionics are provided by various foreign companies, including Elbit, Flight Vision and Thales.

For light attack missions, the aircraft can carry various types of guns, bombs, rockets and missiles dependent upon customer requirements. Other equipment can include external fuel tanks, a centrally mounted forward-looking infrared (FLIRA) sensor and a laser range finder.

Operational history

The Republic of Korea Air Force (ROKAF) is the primary customer for the type. During 2000, the first KT-1 Woongbi was handed over to the ROKAF; deliveries had originally been scheduled to commence two years earlier. By the end of that year, eight aircraft had been delivered to the service; reportedly, a rate of production of two aircraft per month had been achieved by this point. By November 2003, the assembly line was reportedly about to be put on hold following the completion of the ROKAF's order; however, KAI aimed to restart production within two-three years based upon follow-on orders. However, a follow-on ROKAF order for 20 aircraft was received that same month. The majority of the ROKAF's fleet can be armed with both gun pods and rockets, which are intended to be used for weapons training.

One of the first export customers for the KT-1 was Indonesia. During early 2001, Indonesia exchanged 8 CASA/IPTN CN-235 transport aircraft for 12 KT-1 trainers. On 25 April 2003, the first KT-1 was delivered to Indonesia, a move which represented the first Korean aircraft export; commenting at the time, KAI stated that it was presently in negotiations for a 13-trainer follow-on order. During early 2011, reported emerged that Indonesia was interested in further acquisitions, but South Korean officials denied that any further barter deals had been agreed. During November 2018, three additional KT-1B aircraft were ordered for the Indonesian Air Force (IAF).

In addition to its use as a basic trainer, the IAF have equipped their Jupiter Aerobatic Team with the KT-1. On 15 March 2015, a serious midair collision occurred during a practice session for Malaysia's Langkawi International Maritime and Aerospace Exhibition. Initial reports stated that all four pilots survived the collision.

During June 2007, South Korea and Turkey successfully negotiated a   contract for 40 (+15) KT-1s; this exchange involved the modular armor technology of the K2 Black Panther main battle tank (MBT), which Turkey hopes to use upon its own future indigenous Atlay MBT. The last of these aircraft, which were designated KT-1T and jointly manufactured by the two nations, was delivered during late 2012. During April 2015, it was announced that Turkey would procure a further 15 KT-1Ts as a stop-gap measure until development of its indigenous TAI Hürkuş trainer aircraft could be completed.

On 6 November 2012, KAI and the Peruvian Air Force signed a contract for 20 KT-1Ps, comprising ten KT and ten KA versions as well as some offset and technology transfer arrangements, for an approximate amount of US$208 million. KAI was to provide the first four aircraft by the end of 2014, while the remainder were to be locally assembled by SEMAN, the maintenance air wing of the Peruvian Air Force. The type shall progressively replace the aging fleets of Aermacchi MB-339 and Embraer EMB 312 Tucano aircraft. During April 2015, the first locally manufactured KT-1P was delivered to the Peruvian Air Force.

During November 2018, Spain proposed a barter deal to South Korea's Defense Acquisition Program Administration (DAPA) involving the KT-1 and other Korean aircraft, potentially involving up to 30 planes, which Spain wished to exchange for up to 6 Airbus A400M Atlas transport planes. If completed, this deal would be first export of the KT-1 to a European Union country.

Variants

KTX-1 Yeo-myung
Prototype primary trainer each with a different engine fitted, six built. KTX-1 turboprop trainer in 1988, and the first prototype flew in 1991. The first two prototypes were powered by the 550-shp. Pratt & Whitney Canada PT6A-25A turboprop.

KT-1
KT-1 is the basic trainer of the ROKAF. Compared to the KTX-1 prototype, the KT-1 is bigger, heavier, the tail surfaces are relocated and it has a more powerful P&W Canada PT6A-62.(950-shp)

KA-1
An armed advanced trainer with light-attack and forward air control capabilities. Several new features unique to the KA-1 are a head-up display and up-front control panel, MFD panels, and five hardpoints, two under each wing and one under the fuselage. The hardpoints may be equipped with rocket launchers, gun pods or AIM-9 Sidewinder missiles.

KT-1B
Export version for Indonesia. Main differences are in terms of avionics, some of which have been excluded or have had commercial off-the-shelf (COTS) alternatives used instead.

KT-1C
Improved, armed export version equipped with a centreline forward looking infrared pod. The KT-1C may also be equipped with a 12.7 mm gun pod, chaffes, flares, training missiles, rockets or unguided bombs.

KT-1T
Export version for Turkey.

KT-1P
Export version for Peru.

KA-1P
Armed export version for Peru.

KA-1S
Armed export version for Senegal.

Operators

 Indonesian Air Force received 17 KT-1Bs.

 Republic of Korea Air Force received 85 KT-1s and 20 KA-1s

 Peruvian Air Force received a total of 20 aircraft (10 KT-1P and 10 KA-1P). These aircraft are in service with Escuadrón Aéreo 512, based at Pisco. The Peruvian Air Force named the KT-1P Torito (little Bull) in honour of the North American NA-50 flown by Peruvian air force hero José Quiñones Gonzales.

 Senegalese Air Force - received 4 KA-1Ss.

 Turkish Air Force 40 KT-1Ts

Accidents 
On 9 April 2021, a KT-1 trainer aircraft had crashed to the Aegean Sea. Both pilots were recovered by search and rescue teams tasked by the Turkish Air Force. While one of the pilots had ejected himself, the remaining pilot managed to crash-land the KT-1 and preserved the structural integrity of the aircraft.

On 1 April 2022, four ROKAF pilots were killed after a pair of KT-1s crashed into each other over a mountain northeast of Sacheon.

On 26 December 2022, a KA-1 crashed soon after takeoff after being dispatched in response to North Korean drones violating South Korean airspace. The crew escaped unharmed.

Specifications (KT-1)

See also

References

Citations

Bibliography

External links

 Official Website
 KT-1 Woongbi Korean Basic Trainer on GlobalSecurity.org

KT-1
1990s South Korean military trainer aircraft
Single-engined tractor aircraft
Low-wing aircraft
Single-engined turboprop aircraft
Aircraft first flown in 1991